Aspidophytine is an indole alkaloid that has attracted a lot of attention from synthetic chemists. An extract of the cockroach plant, aspidophytine is an insecticidal substance particularly effective against cockroaches. It is one of the two components of the dimer haplophytine.

In his suicide note, Harvard doctoral student Jason Altom mentioned his stress in attempting to devise a synthetic pathway for the aspidophytine sub-unit of haplophytine as a contributing factor to his psychological breakdown.

References 

Tryptamine alkaloids
Alkaloids found in Apocynaceae
Lactones
Catechol ethers
Indolizidines
Phenethylamine alkaloids